The   was a syndicalist trade union federation in Japan. The organization was founded on May 24, 1926, and set up an office in Tokyo. The organization was highly decentralized, rather than having a president and other leadership posts found in other trade union centres it had a four-member liaison committee.

The organization was the major syndicalist force in the country, but the influence of syndicalism in Japan had begun to decline after the 1923 earthquake (after which other trade union movements had begun to reorient themselves to political work). The National Libertarian Federation of Trade Unions stuck to the tactics of direct action, refuting parliamentary politics, and was gradually isolated. A debate surged whether the organization should adapt its orientation to the changing social context of Japan, a debate that spurred internal conflicts which led to a near total marginalization of the organization.

The organization published the monthly newspaper / between June 5, 1926 and February 28, 1935.

References

National trade union centers of Japan
Anarcho-syndicalism
1926 establishments in Japan
Trade unions established in 1926
Trade unions in Japan
Syndicalist trade unions